Juliet Reagh (born September 5, 1964) is an American actress and model. She was the Penthouse Pet for April 1987 under the name "Jenna Persaud".

Life and career
Reagh is from Trinidad and of Indian descent. In April 1987, she was the Pet of the Month for an issue of Penthouse, and, in 1989, Reagh was the Pet of the Year Runner-Up. She appeared in a number of films made in the 1990s.

Partial filmography
 1998 Futuresport  
 1996 Bounty Hunters 
 1996 Bordello of Blood
 1992 The Other Woman

References

External links
 

1964 births
Living people
Penthouse Pets